Bothriomyrmex modestus is a species of ant in the genus Bothriomyrmex. Described by Radchenko in 1985, the species is endemic to the Russian Federation and Ukraine.

References

Bothriomyrmex
Hymenoptera of Europe
Insects of Russia
Insects described in 1985